Takabuti was a married woman who reached an age of between twenty and thirty years. She lived in the Egyptian city of Thebes at the end of the Twenty-fifth Dynasty of Egypt. Her mummified body and mummy case are in the Ulster Museum, Belfast.

The coffin was opened and the mummy unrolled on 27 January 1835 in Belfast Natural History Society’s museum at College Square North. Edward Hincks, a leading Egyptologist from Ireland was present and deciphered the Egyptian hieroglyphs which revealed that she was mistress of a great house. Her mother’s name was Taseniric and her father was a priest of Amun. She was buried in a cemetery west of Thebes. It was initially  suggested that Takabuti was murdered due to knife wounds found on her body. During this investigation, Takabuti's mtDNA was tested and determined to be (mitochondrial haplogroup H4a1).
in the archaeological record H4a1 has been reported in sixth–fourteenth century CE remains sourced from the Canary Islands, and three additional ancient DNA samples, two from Bell Beaker and Unetice contexts (2500–1575 BCE) at Quedlinburg and Eulau, both in Saxony-Anhalt, Germany , and one individual from early Bronze Age Bulgaria illustrating both the rare occurrence and sporadic distribution of this haplogroup.
The H4a1 variant possessed by Takabuti is relatively rare with a modern distribution including ~ 2% of a southern Iberian population , ~ 1% in a Lebanese population and ~ 1.5% of multiple Canary Island populations.

In 2020, Researcher Angela Stienne accused the investigators of wanting to prove that ancient Egyptians were white, an accusation dismissed by chief curator Hannah Crowdy.

After the Napoleonic Wars there was a brisk trade in Egyptian mummies. Takabuti was purchased in 1834 by Thomas Greg of Ballymenoch House, Holywood, Co. Down. At that time, the unwrapping of a mummy was of considerable scientific interest (as well as curiosity) and later studies revealed beetles later identified as Necrobia mumiarum Hope, 1834, Dermestes maculatus DeGeer, 1774 (as D. vulpinus) and Dermestes frischi Kugelann, 1792 (as D. pollinctus Hope, 1834). The painted coffin was itself of considerable interest and the wrappings of fine linen were given much attention in the town that was the commercial centre of the Irish linen industry. One hundred and seventy years later Takabuti remains a popular attraction for visitors.

In April of 2021, a new book on Takabuti was published, revealing that she had not been killed by a knife, but instead by an axe, probably while she was attempting to escape from her assailant (speculated to either be an Assyrian soldier or one of Takabuti's own people). The wound was found in her upper left shoulder, and was more than likely instantaneously fatal. It was also found that Takabuti's heart had not been removed (as previously thought), and she possessed two very rare mutations: an extra tooth (which appears in 0.02 percent of the population) and an extra vertebra (which occurs in 2 per cent of the population).

DNA research

The University of Manchester’s KNH Centre performed an analysis of mitochondrial and exomic genome on Takabuti. The findings show that Takabuti has the H4a1 mitochondrial DNA haplogroup (a haplogroup defines a group of genetic variants held by people who share a common ancestor. Mitochondrial defines the ancestry on the maternal side).

References

External links
Transactions Entomological Society of London:1835

People of the Twenty-fifth Dynasty of Egypt
Ancient Egyptian mummies
Ancient Egyptian women